Diamer may refer to:

 Nanga Parbat, locally known as Diamer
 Diamer District, Pakistan
 Diamer, Mauritania

See also 
 Diamer-Bhasha Dam